The 1969 Tirreno–Adriatico was the fourth edition of the Tirreno–Adriatico cycle race and was held from 11 March to 15 March 1969. The race started in Bracciano and finished in San Benedetto del Tronto. The race was won by Carlo Chiappano.

General classification

References

1969
1969 in Italian sport